The Regional Incubator for West Africa or IRAO is an African business incubator whose head office is located in Abidjan, the economic capital of Ivory Coast.

Aims

The IRAO is a member institution of the Network of Universities of Science and Technology of the Countries of Africa south of the Sahara.

Common to several universities in West Africa, the IRAO's role is to facilitate immersion and professional integration of African students providing internships and various services to project business creation.

The IRAO has also a foundation that distributes scholarships to students from Sub-Saharan Africa.

References

External links
 

Business incubators of Ivory Coast
Organizations established in 2010
2010 establishments in Ivory Coast